Dreyer is the remnant of a lunar impact crater on the far side of the Moon. It is located along the eastern edge of the Mare Marginis, about midway between the craters Ginzel to the north and Erro to the south-southeast. It was named after Danish-Irish astronomer John L. E. Dreyer.

The rim of this crater is heavily worn, with multiple impacts overlaying the edge and a small gap at the south end. The satellite crater Dreyer C lies across the northeastern rim, while Dreyer K intrudes into the southeastern side. The interior floor is relatively level and featureless, with a few tiny craterlets marking the surface. There is a low central ridge at the midpoint.

Satellite craters
By convention these features are identified on lunar maps by placing the letter on the side of the crater midpoint that is closest to Dreyer.

References

External links

Dreyer at The Moon Wiki

Related articles
  - showing the crater with the name not being mentioned but with a question mark

Impact craters on the Moon